Sapaca can refer to:

 Sapaca, Honaz
 Sapaca, Kastamonu